John Pelu (born 2 February 1982) is a former Swedish professional footballer who played for different clubs in Sweden, Norway and Azerbaijan.

Career 
He formerly played for Helsingborgs IF and Östers IF in Sweden and Kongsvinger IL in Norway.

In March 2009, the Houston Dynamo of Major League Soccer had him in for a one-week trial as they looked for a replacement for former striker Nate Jaqua.

On 30 March, however, Pelu signed for Norwegian First Division side FK Haugesund on loan, before signing on a permanent deal later on in that year.

References

External links
Player profile at Rosenborg.info

1982 births
Living people
Burkinabé emigrants to Sweden
Swedish footballers
Helsingborgs IF players
Östers IF players
Kongsvinger IL Toppfotball players
Rosenborg BK players
FK Haugesund players
FK Mughan players
Ravan Baku FC players
Strindheim IL players
Eliteserien players
Swedish expatriate footballers
Expatriate footballers in Norway
Swedish expatriate sportspeople in Norway
Expatriate footballers in Azerbaijan
Association football forwards
Swedish expatriate sportspeople in Azerbaijan